İcilli is a village of the Bulancak district of Giresun in Turkey. Its population is 482 (2021).

History 
The old name of the village is mentioned as İncirli in the records of 1902.

Geography 
The village is 30 km from Giresun city center and 15 km from Bulancak district center. The village is in the south of Bulancak and is directly connected to the district center via a village via Ahmetli and Süme villages.

Population

References 

Villages in Turkey
Villages in Bulancak District